The 2016–17 season was the 26th consecutive season in the top Ukrainian football league for Dynamo Kyiv. Dynamo won the 2016 Ukrainian Super Cup and competed in the Premier League, Ukrainian Cup and UEFA Champions League. Dynamo reached the final of the Ukrainian Cup, finished in second place in the Premier League, and qualified to the Champions League third qualifying round for next season.

Players

Squad information

Transfers

In

Out

Pre-season and friendlies

Competitions

Overall

Last updated:

Premier League

League table

Results summary

Results by round

Matches

Ukrainian Cup

Notes:
 Match postponed due to the frozen pitch at Naftovyk Stadium being unplayable.

Ukrainian Super Cup

UEFA Champions League

Group stage

Statistics

Appearances and goals

|-
! colspan=14 style=background:#dcdcdc; text-align:center| Goalkeepers

|-
! colspan=14 style=background:#dcdcdc; text-align:center| Defenders

|-
! colspan=14 style=background:#dcdcdc; text-align:center| Midfielders

|-
! colspan=14 style=background:#dcdcdc; text-align:center| Forwards

|-
! colspan=14 style=background:#dcdcdc; text-align:center| Players transferred out during the season

Last updated: 31 May 2017

Goalscorers

Last updated: 31 May 2017

Clean sheets

Last updated: 7 May 2017

Disciplinary record

Last updated: 31 May 2017

References

External links
Official website

Dynamo Kyiv
FC Dynamo Kyiv seasons
Dynamo Kyiv